Bis is a 2015 French comedy film directed by Dominique Farrugia. The film is starring Kad Merad and Franck Dubosc.

Plot 
After an accident two childhood friends are transported back to 1986.

Cast 
 Kad Merad as Patrice Olesky 
 Franck Dubosc as Eric Drigeard 
 Alexandra Lamy as Caroline 
 Gérard Darmon as Eric's father
 Julien Boisselier as Patrice's father
 Anne Girouard as Eric's mother
 Eléonore Bernheim as Patrice's mother
 Antonin Chalon as Patrice (teenager)  
 Fabian Wolfrom as Eric (teenager)
 Eden Ducourant as Elodie (teenager)
 Élodie Hesme as Anne 
 Ariane Brodier as Sabrina
 Alix Bénézech as Sandrine
 Emeline Sannier as Chloé

References

External links 
 

2015 films
2010s buddy comedy films
2010s French-language films
French buddy comedy films
Films about time travel
EuropaCorp films
Films set in the 1980s
Films set in the 2010s
2015 comedy films
2010s French films